Albertine Caron-Legris (1906–1972) was a Canadian pianist, composer and music educator. Many of her manuscripts and personal papers are held in the collection at the Library and Archives Canada.

Early life
Born Albertine Caron in Louiseville, Quebec, Caron-Legris began her piano studies with Romain-Octave Pelletier I in Montreal in her youth. She later studied the piano with Michel Hirvy, voice with Rodolphe Plamondon, and music composition with Eugène Lapierre at the Conservatoire national de musique. Several years into her professional career she entered the Université de Montréal where she earned a Bachelor of Music degree in 1942.

Career
Caron-Legris married Mr. Legris in 1918, after which she taught music in Montreal and toured throughout Quebec as a recitalist. In the 1920s, she began to gain recognition as a composer of vocal songs and piano works in Quebec. Many of her pieces used folksong harmonizations. Her most well-known composition is the 1947 song "La Berceuse de Donalda" which was featured on both the radio and television version of the Canadian Broadcasting Corporation program Un Homme et son péché. In 1962, her collection of song melodies for piano, Mes Plus Belles Chansons, was published through a grant by the Canada Council. Her other works include Poème pastorale for the piano (published 1948) and the songs "Ceux qui s'aiment sont toujours malheureux" (published 1947) and "Soir d'hiver" (published 1948).

During her lifetime, Her works were included in the concert repertoires of Canadian musicians Maureen Forrester, Raoul Jobin, Marthe Létourneau, Nicholas Massue and Albert Viau.

In 1972, Caron-Legris died in Montreal at the age of 66.

References

1906 births
1972 deaths
People from Louiseville
Conservatoire national de musique alumni
Université de Montréal alumni
Canadian music educators
Canadian classical pianists
Canadian women pianists
Musicians from Montreal
20th-century classical pianists
20th-century Canadian composers
20th-century Canadian pianists
Women music educators
Women classical pianists
20th-century women composers
20th-century Canadian women musicians
Canadian women composers
20th-century women pianists